Peter Davenport may refer to:

Peter Davenport (born 1961), footballer and sports manager
Peter Davenport, musician and founder of British rock and roll band The Stargazers (1980s group)
Peter Davenport, ufologist and director (since 1994) of the National UFO Reporting Center